Walter Schneir (December 14, 1927, Brooklyn – April 11, 2009, Pleasantville, New York) was an American author.

Early life 
Walter Daniel Schneir was born in Brooklyn, New York and lived in Albany, New York.

Career 

After graduating from Syracuse University, where he majored in journalism, he worked in New York City at the National Foundation for Infantile Paralysis and at MD Medical Newsmagazine. In his career as a free-lance writer, he authored articles on science, politics, education, and law. His work appeared in The Nation, the Reporter, Liberation, the New York Times Magazine, and other national publications. His book on the trial of Julius and Ethel Rosenberg, Invitation to an Inquest, co-authored with his wife, Miriam Schneir, was published in 1965. Subsequent editions appeared in the United States in 1968, 1973, and 1983, and in Great Britain and Cuba. An anthology, Telling it Like It Was: The Chicago Riots, appeared in 1969. Final Verdict: What Really Happened in the Rosenberg Case, with Preface and Afterword by Miriam Schneir, was published posthumously.

Personal life
Schneir is survived by his wife Miriam (1933- ), and a daughter, two sons, and four grandchildren.

References

External links 
 The Miriam and Walter Schneir Collection at Howard Gotlieb Archival Research Center

1927 births
2009 deaths
Syracuse University alumni
People from Pleasantville, New York
American male non-fiction writers
20th-century American male writers
20th-century American non-fiction writers
Writers from Brooklyn